Mont-Tremblant/Lac Ouimet Water Aerodrome  was located on Lac Ouimet near Mont-Tremblant, Quebec, Canada. The airport was listed as abandoned in the 15 March 2007 Canada Flight Supplement.

See also
 Mont-Tremblant/Lac Duhamel Water Aerodrome
 Mont-Tremblant/Saint-Jovite Airport

References

Defunct seaplane bases in Quebec
Airports in Laurentides